Alban is a surname. Notable people with the surname include:

Carlo Alban (born 1979), Ecuadorian actor
Dick Alban (born 1929), American football player
Fernando Albán (born 1962), Venezuelan politician
Frank Alban (born 1949), Australian politician
James S. Alban, American politician
Juan Alban, Australian musician
Laureano Albán (born 1942), Costa Rican writer
Mark Alban (born 1966), English cricketer
Pushpa Leela Alban, Indian politician
Robert Alban (born 1952), French cyclist
V. Alban, Indian politician